
Year 583 (DLXXXIII) was a common year starting on Friday (link will display the full calendar) of the Julian calendar. The denomination 583 for this year has been used since the early medieval period, when the Anno Domini calendar era became the prevalent method in Europe for naming years.

Events 
 By place 

 Byzantine Empire 
 Emperor Maurice decides to end the annual tribute to the Avars, a mounted people who have swept across Russia and threatened the Balkan Peninsula. They capture the cities of Singidunum (modern Belgrade) and Viminacium (Moesia).

 Europe  
 King Liuvigild lays siege to Seville (Southern Spain), and forms an alliance with the Byzantines. He summons his rebellious son Hermenegild back to Toledo, and forces him to abandon the Chalcedonian Faith.
 The city of Monemvasia (Peloponnese) is founded by people seeking refuge from the Slavs and Avars.
 Eboric (also called Euric) succeeds his father Miro as king of the Suevi (Hispania Gallaecia).

 Arabia 
 Muhammad, age 12, accompanies his uncle Abu Talib during trading journeys to Syria.

 Mesoamerica 
 Yohl Ik'nal succeeds Kan B'alam I as queen of the Maya city of Palenque (Mexico).

 By topic 

 Medicine 
 Smallpox begins spreading from China to Japan and Korea (approximate date).

Births 
 Abu Ubaidah, companion of Muhammad (d. 639)
 Liuva II, king of the Visigoths (d. 603)
 Theodosius, Byzantine co-emperor (approximate date)
Umar, companion of Muhammad (d. 644) and second Caliph of Rashidun Caliphate
 Xiao Xian, prince of the Liang Dynasty (d. 621)

Deaths 
 February 1 – Kan B'alam I, ruler of Palenque (b. 524)
 Miro, king of the Suevi (approximate date)

References